Rudkin is a surname. Notable people with the surname include:

Alan Rudkin (1941–2010) British, Commonwealth, and European bantamweight boxer
Charles Rudkin (1872–1957), British soldier, barrister and politician
David Rudkin (born 1936), English playwright
Ethel Rudkin (1893–1985), English historian, archaeologist, and folklorist
Filipp Rudkin (1893–1954), Belarusian Soviet Army major general 
Frank H. Rudkin (1864–1931), American judge
Jon Rudkin (born 1968), English football coach 
Margaret Rudkin (1897–1967), American business executive
Mark Rudkin, British soldier
Tommy Rudkin (1919–1969), English professional footballer